The following is a list of prominent people who were born in the American state of Maine, live in Maine, or for whom Maine is a significant part of their identity.

A

Angela Adams (born 1965), designer; born in North Haven
Paul André Albert (1926–2019), scientist; born in Van Buren
Tom Allen (born 1945), politician, Congressman (1997–2009); born in Portland
Adelbert Ames (1835–1933), military officer, politician, Governor of Mississippi (1868–1870; 1874–1876), United States Senator from Mississippi (1870–1874); born in Rockland
Benjamin Ames (1778–1835), politician, Governor of Maine (1821–1822); lived in Houlton
Erin Andrews (born 1978), sportscaster, Dancing With the Stars contestant and co-host; born in Bangor

B

John Baldacci (born 1955), politician, Governor of Maine (2003–2011), Congressman (1995–2003); born in Bangor, lives in Portland
Christopher Daniel Barnes (born 1972), actor, voice actor, The Little Mermaid film, Spider-Man television series; born in Portland
Trevor Bates (born 1993), NFL player; born in Portland
Leon Leonwood Bean (1872–1967), founder of L.L. Bean Inc., a large private retail company in Freeport
Corey Beaulieu (born 1983), musician, guitarist in Trivium; born in Brunswick
Anna Belknap (born 1974), actress, Lindsay Monroe on CSI: NY; born in Damariscotta
Joan Benoit (born 1957), first women's Olympic marathon champion; born in Cape Elizabeth
Louisa Dow Benton (1831-1895), linguist, translator; born in Portland
Jacques Berlinerblau (born 1966), religious scholar, Georgetown University professor; born in Portland
Carroll Thayer Berry (1886–1978), printmaker, woodcut engraver, painter and photographer; born in New Gloucester
Nina Blackwood (born 1955), radio and television personality, actor, model; lives in Mid Coast region
James G. Blaine (1830–1893), United States Representative, Senator, and Secretary of State, Republican presidential candidate in 1884
Dennis Blair (born 1947), US Director of National Intelligence (2009–2010), retired four-star U.S. Navy admiral; born in Kittery
Cindy Blodgett (born 1975), basketball player and coach; born in Clinton; Attended Lawrence High School and later University of Maine Orono
Tim Boetsch (born 1981), mixed martial artist; born in Lincolnville
Gordon Bok (born 1939), folk singer-songwriter; born in Camden
Milton Bradley (1836–1911), board game manufacturer with the Milton Bradley Company; born in Vienna
Joseph E. Brennan (born 1934), politician, Governor of Maine (1979–1987), Congressman (1987–1991); born in Portland
Contessa Brewer (born 1974), news anchor for MSNBC; born in Parsonsfield
Brett Brown (born 1961), head coach and general manager for the Philadelphia 76ers; born in South Portland
Harry Brown (1917–1986), poet, novelist, screenwriter; born in Portland
Scott Brown (born 1959), U.S. Senator from Massachusetts (2010–13); born in Kittery
Ashley Bryan (1923–2022), writer and illustrator; resides in Cranberry Isles
Marisa Butler (born 1994), American model, Singer and Beauty Pageant title holder; Miss Maine USA 2016, Miss World America 2018 and Miss Earth USA 2021
Brian Butterfield (born 1958), third-base coach for the Chicago Cubs; born in Bangor

C

Nik Caner-Medley (born 1983), basketball player; born in Portland
John Cariani (born 1969), actor, Law & Order; grew up in Presque Isle
Howie Carr (born 1952), journalist, author, radio talk-show host; born in Portland
Bill Carrigan (1883–1969), catcher and manager for Boston Red Sox; born in Lewiston
Rachel Carson (1907–1964), author; lived in Southport
Walter Case Jr., harness racer
Elisabeth Cavazza (1849-1926), author, journalist; born in Portland
Joshua Chamberlain (1828–1914), Civil War Major General, Governor of Maine (1867–1871)
Thomas Davee Chamberlain (1841–1896), Civil War Lieutenant Colonel, brother of Major General Joshua Chamberlain.
Conrad Chase (born 1965), actor, singer; born in Portland
Oren Burbank Cheney (1816–1903), student, teacher, principal Parsonsfield Seminary; Free Will Baptist clergyman; abolitionist; founding president of Bates College
Yvon Chouinard (born 1938), founder of Black Diamond Equipment and Patagonia, born in Lewiston
Cody Christian (born 1995), actor; Pretty Little Liars, Teen Wolf; born in Portland and grew up on a Penobscot reservation
Frank Churchill (1901–1942), Oscar-winning composer for many Disney animated films; born in Rumford
Carolyn Chute (born 1947), novelist, populist political activist; born in Portland; lives in Parsonsfield
Nathan Clifford (1803–1881), Associate Justice of the United States Supreme Court, Attorney General of the United States; lived in Newfield
Eunice Hale Cobb (1803-1880), writer, activist; born in Kennebunk
William Cohen (born 1940), U.S. Congressman (1973–1979), Senator (1979–1997), US Secretary of Defense (1997–2001); born in and Mayor of Bangor (1971–1973)
Samuel Colman (1832–1920), artist, writer, interior designer; born in Portland
Susan Collins (born 1952), U.S. Senator from Maine; born in Caribou
Jennie Maria Drinkwater Conklin (1841-1900), author, activist; born in Portland
William Coperthwaite (1930–2013), educator and yurt advocate; born in Monticello
Ron Corning (born 1971), TV host at WFAA in Dallas, Texas; raised in Calais
Mike "Fluff" Cowan (born 1947), PGA Tour golf caddy; born in Winslow
Ricky Craven (born 1966), ESPN broadcaster, NASCAR driver; born in Newburgh
Laura Creavalle (born 1959), Guyanese-born Canadian/American professional bodybuilder; lives in Old Orchard Beach
Ian Crocker (born 1982), three-time Olympic champion in swimming; born in Portland
Effie Crockett (1856–1940), actress, wrote and composed the lullaby "Rock-a-bye Baby"; born in Rockland
John Crowley (born 1942), author of fantasy, science fiction and mainstream fiction; born in Presque Isle
Earl Cunningham (1893–1977), folk artist; born in Edgecomb
Dick Curless (1932–1995), country singer; born in Fort Fairfield
Ron Currie Jr. (born 1975), author; lives in Portland

D

Sarah D'Alelio (born 1980), professional mixed martial artist; born in Belfast
Frances Brackett Damon (1857-1939), poet, writer; born in Dexter
Olive E. Dana (1859-1904), writer, poet; born in Augusta
Bette Davis (1908–1989), two-time Oscar-winning actress; born in Massachusetts and lived in Cape Elizabeth
Owen Davis (1874–1956), Pulitzer Prize-winning dramatist; born in Portland
Howie Day (born 1981), singer; born and raised in Brewer
William Deering (1826–1913), businessman and philanthropist, co-founder of International Harvester; born in South Paris
Grace DeGennaro (born 1956), artist; resides in Yarmouth
Patrick Dempsey (born 1966), actor; born in Lewiston
Rick DiPietro (born 1981), NHL player; born in Lewiston
Dorothea Dix (1802–1878), pioneering advocate for treatment and care of the handicapped and mentally ill; born in Hampden
Nelson Dingley Jr. (1832–1899), Governor of Maine (1874–1876), US House of Representatives (1881–1899), responsible for the Dingley Tariff
Jeff Donnell (1921–1988), actress; born in Windham
Alice May Douglas (1865-1943), poet, author, editor; born in Bath
Paul Douglas (1892–1976), economist and Illinois senator (1949–1967); partly raised in Onawa in Piscataquis County
Cornelia M. Dow (1842–1905), philanthropist, temperance activist; born and died in Portland
Brian Dumoulin (born 1991), NHL player, Pittsburgh Penguins; born in Biddeford
Emma B. Dunham (1826-1910), poet, teacher; born in Minot; died in Deering

E
Kevin Eastman (born 1962), comic book artist and writer; co-created Teenage Mutant Ninja Turtles; born in Springvale
Stanley Boyd Eaton (born 1938), radiologist, one of the originators of the concept of Paleolithic nutrition; born in Old Town
Gertrude Elliott (1874–1950), actress: stage, silent movies; born in Rockland
Maxine Elliott (1868–1940), stage actress; born in Rockland
Ellen Russell Emerson (1837-1907), author, ethnologist; born in New Sharon
George Barrell Emerson (1797–1881), educator; born in Kennebunk

F

Myrna Fahey (1933–1973), actress, Father of the Bride; born in Carmel
 Terry Farnsworth (born 1942), Canadian Olympic judoka
Parker Fennelly (1891–1988), actor; born in Northeast Harbor
William Pitt Fessenden (1806–1869), politician, Secretary of the Treasury (1864–1865); Congressman (1841–1843); Senator (1854–1864; 1865–1869); lived in Portland
Greg Finley (born 1984), actor, The Secret Life of the American Teenager; born in Portland
Frank Fixaris (1934–2006), sportscaster; resident of Falmouth
Ryan Flaherty (born 1986), infielder for the Atlanta Braves; born in Portland
James Flavin (1906–1976), film and television actor; born in Portland
Charles Flint (1850–1934), businessman, founder of Computing-Tabulating-Recording Company which later became IBM; born in Thomaston
Francis Ford (1881–1953), actor, writer, director, brother of John Ford; born in Portland
John Ford (1894–1973), film director, winner of six Oscars; born in Cape Elizabeth, raised on Munjoy Hill in Portland
Philip Ford (1900–1976), film director, nephew of John Ford; born in Portland
Melville Fuller (1833–1910), eighth Chief Justice of the United States (1888–1910); born in Augusta
Charlie Furbush (born 1986), baseball pitcher; born in Portland, attended St. Joseph's College of Maine

G
Joey Gamache (born 1966), lightweight champion who boxed from 1976 to 2000; originally from Lewiston
Peter A. Garland (1923–2005), politician, Congressman (1961–1963); lived in Brunswick
Scott Garland (born 1973), WWE wrestler, ring name Scotty 2 Hotty; born in Westbrook
Gladys George (1904–1954), actress, The Maltese Falcon, The Best Years of Our Lives; born in Patten
Frank Bunker Gilbreth, Sr. (1868–1924), early advocate of scientific management and pioneer of motion study; born in Fairfield
 Jon Gillies (born 1994), ice hockey player; raised in South Portland
Everett Glass (1891–1966), actor; born in Bangor
Charles Goddard (1879–1951), playwright and screenwriter for silent films; born in Portland
Jared Golden (born 1982), politician, Congressman (2019–); lives in Lewiston
Gary Gordon (1960–1993), Master Sergeant in the U.S. Army who perished during Operation Gothic Serpent; born in Lincoln
Chris Greeley (born 1962), was Cosmo magazine's Bachelor of the Month in June 1993. Appeared on multiple TV shows in the 1990s. 
Noah Gray-Cabey (born 1995), teen actor, My Wife and Kids, Heroes; raised in Newry
Patty Griffin (born 1964), Grammy award-winning singer-songwriter and musician; born in Old Town
Mace Greenleaf (1872–1912), stage and screen actor silent films

H

Edwin Hall (1855–1938), physicist who discovered the "Hall effect"; born in Gorham
John H. Hall (1781–1841), inventor of the M1819 Hall breech-loading rifle; mass production innovator; born in Portland
Hannibal Hamlin (1809–1891), 15th Vice President of the United States and U.S. Senator; born in Paris
Simon Hamlin (1866–1939), politician, Congressman (1935–1937); born in Standish
Frank Handlen (born 1916), artist and shipwright; born in Brooklyn, now the oldest resident in Kennebunkport, Maine
Marsden Hartley (1877–1943), artist, poet; born in Lewiston
George Haskins (1915–1991), law professor at the University of Pennsylvania Law School
Juliana Hatfield (born 1967), guitarist and singer-songwriter; born in Wiscasset
Garnet Hathaway (born 1991), NHL player; raised in Kennebunkport
Heather Hemmens (born 1988), actress, Hellcats; raised in Waldo
James Chico Hernandez (born 1954), Sambo martial artist; resides in Washburn
Richard Herrick, received the first successful organ transplant from identical twin brother Ronald Herrick in 1954; born and lived in Maine
Joe Hill (born 1971), horror novelist; born in Hermon
John Hodgman (born 1971), actor, writer and comedian; lives in Brooklin
Will Holt (1929–2015), singer-songwriter, librettist and lyricist; born in Portland
Winslow Homer (1836–1910), 19th-century painter; lived in Prouts Neck
Caroline Dana Howe (1824-1907), writer, poet, hymnwriter; born in Fryeburg
Helen Marr Hurd (1839-1909), educator, poet; born in Harmony; died in St. Albans

I

Robert Indiana (1928–2018), pop artist; lived in Vinalhaven

J
Dave Jackson (1902–1978), Allagash Wilderness Waterway guide
Theodora R. Jenness (1847-1935), writer, editor; born in Greenwood
Sarah Orne Jewett (1849–1909), novelist and short story writer; lived in South Berwick
Jigger Johnson (1871–1935), logger and American folk hero known for his numerous off-the-job exploits

K

Natalie Kalmus (1882–1965), "color supervisor" of virtually all Technicolor feature films made from 1934 to 1949; born in Houlton
Linda Kasabian (born 1949), member of Charles Manson's "family"; born in Biddeford
David E. Kelley (born 1956), Emmy-winning television producer and writer; born in Waterville
Anna Kendrick (born 1985), Oscar-nominated actress, Jessica Stanley in The Twilight Saga; born in Portland
Matthew Kenney (born 1964), celebrity chef, author, educator and entrepreneur; raised in Searsport; graduated from University of Maine at Orono
Sumner Kimball (1834–1923), General Supt. of U.S. Life-Saving Service; born in Lebanon; raised in Sanford
Angus King (born 1944), Governor of Maine (1995–2003), US Senator from Maine (since 2013); lives in Brunswick
Owen King (born 1977), author; raised in Bangor
Stephen King (born 1947), novelist whose books have sold more than 350 million copies; born in Portland; raised in Durham lives in Bangor.
Tabitha King (born 1949), novelist; born in Old Town lives in Bangor.
William King (1788–1852), politician, first Governor of Maine (1820–1821); born in Scarborough

L

Linda Lavin (born 1937), actress, Alice, six-time Tony Award nominee; born and raised in Portland
Abby Fisher Leavitt (1836-1897), social reformer, newspaper publisher; born in Bangor
Bud Leavitt Jr. (1917–1994), Bangor sportswriter, outdoor columnist, television host
Paul LePage (born 1948), politician, Governor of Maine (2011–2019), Mayor of Waterville (2003–2011); born in Lewiston
Enoch Lincoln (1788–1829), politician, Governor of Maine (1827–1829), US Congressman (1818–1826); lived in Augusta
Tawny Little (born 1956), 1976 Miss America, television journalist; born in Portland
Elle Logan (born 1987), 2008 Olympic gold medalist in women's rowing; born in Portland
Alvin Orlando Lombard (1856–1937), inventor of continuous tracked vehicles; born in Springfield
James B. Longley (1924–1980), first Independent Governor of Maine (1975–1979); born in Bangor
James B. Longley Jr. (born 1951), politician, Congressman (1995–1997); born in Lewiston
Barry B. Longyear (born 1942), novelist, author of Enemy Mine; lives in New Sharon
Henry Wadsworth Longfellow (1807–1882), poet, born and raised in Portland; attended Bowdoin College
Bob Ludwig (born 1945), audio mastering engineer, founder of Gateway Mastering and DVD in Portland

M

Marc Macaulay (born 1957), actor, Burn Notice; born in Millinocket
Frances Laughton Mace (1836-1899), poet; born in Orono
Dick MacPherson (1930–2017), football coach; born in Old Town
Nicole Maines (born 1997), actress, Supergirl, LGBT rights activist; lives in Portland
Ella M. S. Marble (1850-1929), physician; born in Gorham; died in Paris
Bob Marley (born 1967), stand-up comedian; from Portland; born in Bangor
Andrea Martin (born 1947), actress, comedian, voice actress, SCTV, My Big Fat Greek Wedding, Kim Possible, Earthworm Jim; born in Portland
H.S. Maxim (1840–1916), inventor of Maxim gun; born in Sangerville
Julia Harris May (1833-1912), poet, teacher, founder; born in Strong
David McCullough (born 1933), author, historian, Pulitzer Prize winner; lives in Camden
Cynthia McFadden (born 1956), co-anchor of Nightline and Primetime; born in Lewiston
John McKernan (born 1948), politician, Governor of Maine (1987–1995), Congressman (1983–1987); born in Bangor
Victor McKusick (1921–2008), physician, scientist, "father of medical genetics"; born in Parkman
Vincent McKusick (1921–2014), attorney, Chief Justice of Maine Supreme Judicial Court; born in Parkman
Christian McLaughlin (born 1967), TV writer, producer, novelist; born in Houlton
Vaughn Meader (1936–2004), comedian, impersonator, musician, film actor; born in Waterville
Estelle M. H. Merrill (1858-1908), journalist, editor; born in Jefferson
Helen Maud Merrill (1865-1943), litterateur, poet; born in Bangor; died in Portland
Mike Michaud (born 1955), politician, Congressman (2003–2015); lives in East Millinocket
Edna St. Vincent Millay (1892–1950); poet, born in Rockland
Janet T. Mills (born 1948); politician, Governor of Maine (2019–); born in Farmington
George J. Mitchell (born 1933), U.S. Senate Majority Leader, significant player in peace process of Northern Ireland; born in Waterville
Herb Mitchell (1937–2011), actor, director; born in Bar Harbor
Matthew Mulligan (born 1985), tight end for Buffalo Bills; born in Bangor and lived in Enfield
Edmund Muskie (1914–1996); politician, Governor and then Senator of Maine, and Democratic vice presidential nominee (1968), U.S. Secretary of State (1980–1981), born in Rumford

N
Emma Huntington Nason (1845-1921), poet, author, musical composer; born in Hallowell
John Neal (1793–1876), writer, critic, editor, lecturer, and activist; lived entire life in Portland except for sixteen years in Boston, Baltimore, and London
Judd Nelson (born 1959), actor, Breakfast Club, Suddenly Susan; born in Portland
 Louise Nevelson (1899–1988), sculptor of found objects; came to Maine when she was five and lived in Rockland
Rachel Nichols (born 1980), actress, Alias, Star Trek, G.I. Joe: The Rise of Cobra; born and raised in Augusta
Stephanie Niznik (1967–2019), actress, Everwood, Vanishing Son, Life Is Wild; born in Bangor
Lillian Nordica (1857–1914), opera singer known as one of the foremost dramatic sopranos of the 19th and 20th centuries; born in Farmington
Edward Lawry Norton (1898–1983), Bell Labs engineer and scientist famous for developing the concept of the Norton equivalent circuit; born in Rockland

O
Harry Oakes (1874–1943), discovered second-largest gold mine in Canada; mysteriously murdered in the Bahamas, which became basis of several books and movies; born in Sangerville
Jeremiah O'Brien (1744–1818), naval officer of American Revolutionary War; born in Kittery
John O'Hurley (born 1954), actor, voice actor, TV personality; J. Peterman on Seinfeld; born in Kittery

P

Albion K. Parris (1788–1857), politician, Governor of Maine (1822–1827), US Senator (1827–1828); born in Hebron
Gilbert Patten (1866–1945), author of the Frank Merriwell novels; born in Corinna
Frannie Peabody (1903–2001), HIV/AIDS activist, helped establish The AIDS Project, and co-founded the Peabody House
Waldo Peirce (1884–1970), artist, born in Bangor; lived most of his life in Maine
Maynard Pennell (1910–1994), Boeing executive and chief engineer of the 707 prototype; born in Skowhegan
Greenleaf Whittier Pickard (1877–1956), radio pioneer and 1926 IEEE Medal of Honor winner; born in Portland
Chellie Pingree (born 1955), politician, Congresswoman (since 2009); lives in North Haven
Bruce Poliquin (born 1953), politician, Congressman (2015–2019); born in Waterville, lives in Oakland
John A. Poor (1808–1871), developer of the Portland gauge Maine railway system; born in Andover
Quinton Porter (born 1982), NFL player; born in Portland
Zach Porter (born 1989), singer-songwriter for Allstar Weekend; born in Bath
Shirley Povich (1905–1998), sports columnist and reporter for The Washington Post; born in Bar Harbor

R
 Esther Ralston (1902–1994), silent film actress; born in Bar Harbor
 Thomas Brackett Reed (1839–1902), U.S. Representative from Maine, and Speaker of the U.S. House of Representatives, 1889–1891 and 1895–1899; born in Portland
 Derek Rivers (born 1994), NFL player; born in Augusta
 Edwin Arlington Robinson (1869–1935), poet; born in Alna and raised in Gardiner
 Aaron Robinson (composer) (born 1970), composer; born in Camden and raised in Waldoboro.
 Nelson Rockefeller (1908–1979), businessman, philanthropist, public servant, Vice President of the United States (1974–1977) and Governor of New York (1959–1973); born in Bar Harbor
 Charles Rocket (1949–2005), actor, Saturday Night Live, Tequila and Bonetti, Dumb and Dumber; born in Bangor
 Lou Rogers (1879–1952), suffrage cartoonist, writer, and radio personality, born in Patten
Daniel Rose (1772–1835), politician, Governor of Maine (1822); lived in Thomaston
 Henrietta Gould Rowe (1834/35-1910), litterateur, author; born in East Corinth
 Victoria Rowell (born 1959), actress, The Young and the Restless, Diagnosis: Murder, Dumb and Dumber; born and raised in Portland
 Travis Roy (1975–2020), college ice hockey player; born in Augusta
 Robert Rushworth (1924–1993), U.S. Air Force major general and test pilot; born in Madison

S

 Tim Sample (born 1951), humorist and author; born in Fort Fairfield and raised in Boothbay Harbor
 Sue A. Sanders (1842-1931), teacher, clubwoman, author; born in Casco
Salome Sellers (1800-1909), centenarian, born in Deer Isle, Maine
 Tony Shalhoub (born 1953), actor; attended University of Southern Maine
 Reta Shaw (1912–1982), actress, The Ghost & Mrs. Muir, Mary Poppins; born in South Paris
 Arthur Shawcross (1945–2008), serial killer; born in Kittery
 Timothy Simons (born 1978), actor, Veep; born in Readfield
 Albion Woodbury Small (1854–1926), sociologist and founder of first university department of sociology in United States; born in Buckfield and raised in Bangor
 Margaret Chase Smith (1897–1995), first woman to serve in both houses of U.S. Congress (1940–1973); first woman to have her name placed in nomination for the Presidency at a major political party's convention; born in Skowhegan
 Samantha Smith (1972–1985), child peace activist, child actress; born in Houlton, later lived in Manchester
 Olympia Snowe (born 1947), Congresswoman and U.S. Senator; born in Augusta and raised in Auburn
 Kate Snow (born 1969), television journalist for NBC News; born in Bangor
 Brett Somers (1922–2007), actress; born in Canada and raised in Portland
 Susan Marr Spalding (1841-1908), poet; born in Bath
 Aly Spaltro (born 1989), musician known professionally as Lady Lamb; began her recording career in Brunswick and lives in Brunswick and New York City
 Ellis Spear (1834–1917), Civil War Lieutenant Colonel of the 20th Maine Infantry Regiment
 Percy Spencer (1894–1970), inventor of the microwave oven; born in Howland
 Spose (born 1985), rapper, podcaster; lives in Wells
 Andrew St. John (born 1982), actor, General Hospital, Life Is Wild; born in Millinocket
 Bob Stanley (born 1954), baseball player, pitched for Boston Red Sox in 1986 World Series
 Cordelia Stanwood (1865–1968), teacher, ornithologist, and wildlife photographer
 C. A. Stephens (1844–1931), writer and gerontologist; born and died in Norway, Maine
 C. J. Stevens (1927–2021), author; born in Smithfield and has lived in Phillips, Weld, and Temple
Harriet Beecher Stowe (1811–1896), author of Uncle Tom's Cabin; lived in Brunswick
 Noel Paul Stookey (born 1937); folk singer and songwriter; member of Peter Paul and Mary group; resides in Blue Hill
 Charlie Summers (born 1956); politician, Secretary of State of Maine (2011–2013); lives in Biddeford
 Bill Swift (born 1961), former MLB pitcher; born in Portland
 Tim Sylvia (born 1976), mixed martial arts fighter, professional wrestler; born in Ellsworth

T

Drew Taggart (born 1989), musician, DJ, singer of the Chainsmokers; grew up in Freeport
Gerald Talbot (born 1931), Maine state legislator (1972–1978), African American civil rights activist; born in Bangor
Phyllis Thaxter (1919–2012), actress, born in Portland
Augustin Thompson (1835–1903), creator of Moxie, born in Union
Brigadier Samuel Thompson (1734–1798), soldier of the American Revolutionary War; lived in Brunswick
Gary Thorne (born 1948), sportscaster, born in Bangor
Andrew J. Tozier (1838–1910), soldier, Congressional Medal of Honor recipient; born in Litchfield
Novella Jewell Trott (1846-1929), author, editor; born in Woolwich
Jeff Turner (born 1962), retired professional basketball player; born in Bangor, Maine
Liv Tyler (born 1977), actress, daughter of Aerosmith singer Steven Tyler, grew up in Maine

U
 John G. Utterback (1872–1955), politician, Congressman (1933–1935); lived in Bangor

V

 Donald Valle (1908–1977), founder and owner of Valle's Steak House restaurant chain; born in Italy, moved to Portland in 1912
 Richard Valle (1931–1995), son of Donald Valle and owner of eponymously named Valle's Steak House; born in Portland
 Rudy Vallée (1901–1986), singer, actor, bandleader, and entertainer; lived in Westbrook
 Todd Verow (born 1966), filmmaker, cinematographer, actor; born in Bangor

W
 Oliver Wahlstrom (born 2000), hockey player; born in Yarmouth
John Bruce Wallace (born 1950), composer, musician, author; born in Calais
 Dan Walters (1966–2020), baseball player; born in Brunswick
 Sam Webb (born 1945), former chairman of Communist Party USA; born in Maine
 Janwillem van de Wetering (1931–2008), novelist; lived in Blue Hill
 Clarence White (1944–1973), bluegrass, country rock, and rock guitarist; born in Lewiston
 E. B. White (1899–1985), essayist, author, humorist, poet; lived in Brooklin
 Ellen G. White (1827–1915), author, co-founder of the Seventh-day Adventist Church; born in Gorham
 Charles Whitman (1842–1910), zoologist, influential to the founding of classical ethology; born in Woodstock
 JoAnn Willette (born 1963), actress, Just the Ten of Us; born in Lewiston
William D. Williamson (1779–1846) politician, Governor of Maine (1821); lived in Bangor
 Dorothy Clarke Wilson (1904–2003), author, playwright; born in Gardiner
 Abba Goold Woolson (1838-1921), writer; born in Windham
 Andrew Wyeth (1917–2009), 20th-century painter; had a home in Cushing
 Jamie Wyeth (born 1946), contemporary painter; has lived in Maine since the mid-1960s
 N. C. Wyeth (1882–1945), artist and illustrator; bought a home in Port Clyde in the 1930s
 Nick Wyman (born 1950), actor, Die Hard with a Vengeance; born in Portland

Z
 Steven Zirnkilton (born 1958), voice actor and former politician; lives in Seal Harbor

See also

 List of Maine suffragists
Lists of Americans

References